, prov. designation: , is a mid-sized trans-Neptunian object located in the outermost region of the Solar System. It was discovered on 9 October 2002, by American astronomers Mike Brown, Chad Trujillo and David Rabinowitz at the Palomar Observatory in California. The resonant trans-Neptunian object stays in a 2:5 resonance with Neptune. It has a reddish color, a rotation period of 56.1 hours and measures at least  in diameter.

Orbit and classification 

 orbits the Sun at a distance of 39.2–71.4 AU once every 410 years and 12 months (150,105 days; semi-major axis of 55.28 AU). Its orbit has an eccentricity of 0.29 and an inclination of 35° with respect to the ecliptic.  In December 2058, It will come to perihelion (minimum distance from the Sun) at 39.2 AU, which is  about the same as Pluto's semi-major axis (average distance from the Sun). Given the long orbit that TNOs have around the Sun,  comes to opposition in late October of each year at an apparent magnitude of 20.5.

Both the Minor Planet Center (MPC) and the Deep Ecliptic Survey (DES) show  to be a resonant trans-Neptunian object in a 2:5 resonance with Neptune, meaning it completes two orbits for every five orbits of Neptune.

Physical characteristics 

 has an absolute magnitude of 3.78. This overestimation was due to insufficient motion to allow for a good sky subtraction, and because  was very close to a brighter background object. Brown noted that the Spitzer measurement involved a very large potential error and that the object would likely be much smaller.

The red spectra suggests that  has very little fresh ice on its surface. However, this short rotation period was most likely an alias due to a bias for shorter and more easily discernable shorter periods.  is highly oblate, and Ortiz et al. suggest a longer rotation period estimate of 56.1 hours.

On 11 November 2021, an occultation across North America and Europe detected an oblate shape of  km (mean 499 km), in strong agreement with the 2018 occultation results. No satellites were detected.

Possible satellite 

If both the primary body and satellite are doubly tidally locked, then the expected orbital period of the satellite would be approximately 54 hours, equal to 's rotation. Given an orbital period of 54 hours, the satellite's estimated orbital separation from the primary would be , with an angular separation of 58 milliarcseconds, too small to be resolved with current space telescopes such as Hubble.

See also 
 Kuiper belt
 Minor planet

Notes

References

External links 

 TNO 2002 TC302, Image of the Month (January 2003)
 List Of Centaurs and Scattered-Disk Objects, Minor Planet Center
 

Trans-Neptunian objects in a 2:5 resonance
Discoveries by the Palomar Observatory
Possible dwarf planets
Objects observed by stellar occultation
20021009